The New Scooby-Doo Movies is an American animated mystery comedy television series produced by Hanna-Barbera for CBS. It is the second television series in Scooby-Doo franchise, and follows the first incarnation, Scooby-Doo, Where Are You! It premiered on September 9, 1972, and ended on October 27, 1973, running for two seasons on CBS as the only hour-long Scooby-Doo series. Twenty-four episodes were produced, 16 for the 1972–73 season and eight more for the 1973–74 season.

Aside from doubling the length of each episode, The New Scooby-Doo Movies differed from its predecessor in the addition of a rotating special guest star slot; each episode featured real world celebrities or well-known animated characters joining the Mystery, Inc. gang in solving mysteries. This concept was later revisited with a similar series titled Scooby-Doo and Guess Who?, which premiered in 2019.

The New Scooby-Doo Movies was the last incarnation of Scooby-Doo airing on CBS, and also the franchise's final time to feature Nicole Jaffe as the regular voice of Velma Dinkley, due to her marriage and retirement from acting.

Overview 
Many of the guest stars who appeared in The New Scooby-Doo Movies were living celebrities who provided their own voices (Don Knotts, Jerry Reed, Cass Elliot, Jonathan Winters, Sandy Duncan, Tim Conway, Dick Van Dyke, Davy Jones and Sonny & Cher, among others); some episodes featured celebrities who were retired or deceased, whose voicing was done by imitators (The Three Stooges and Laurel and Hardy), and the rest were crossovers with present or future Hanna-Barbera characters.

The characters from other Hanna-Barbera shows Harlem Globetrotters, Josie and the Pussycats, Jeannie, and Speed Buggy all appeared on the show during or after their own shows' original runs; The Addams Family and Batman and Robin both appeared on the show a year before they were incorporated into Hanna-Barbera shows of their own, The Addams Family and Super Friends, respectively. Many of the supporting voice roles were done by several celebrities who were famous elsewhere, such as Don Adams (Get Smart).

After The New Scooby-Doo Movies ended its original network run in August 1974, repeats of Scooby-Doo, Where Are You! aired on CBS for the next two years. No new Scooby-Doo cartoons would be produced until the show defected to ABC in September 1976 on the highly publicized The Scooby-Doo/Dynomutt Hour. When the various Scooby-Doo series entered syndication in 1980, each New Movies episode was halved and run as two half-hour parts. The USA Network Cartoon Express began running the New Movies in their original format beginning in September 1990; they were rerun on Sunday mornings until August 1992.

In 1994, The New Scooby-Doo Movies began appearing on three Turner Broadcasting networks: TNT, Cartoon Network and Boomerang. Like many animated series created by Hanna-Barbera in the 1970s, the show contained a laugh track created by the studio. The first season of the series was animated at Hanna-Barbera's main studio in Los Angeles, while the second season was animated at their newly formed studio, Hanna-Barbera Pty, Ltd. in Australia.

Episodes

Staff

Season 1
 Producers/directors: William Hanna and Joseph Barbera
 Story: Jameson Brewer, Tom Dagenais, Ruth Flippen, Fred Freiberger, Willie Gilbert, Bill Lutz, Larry Markes, Norman Maurer, Jack Mendelsohn, Ray Parker, Gene Thompson, Paul West, Harry Winkler

Season 2
 Producers/directors: William Hanna and Joseph Barbera
 Story: Jack Mendelsohn, Tom Dagenais, Norman Maurer, Larz Bourne, Woody Kling, Sid Morse

Voice cast

Main 
 Don Messick – Scooby-Doo
 Casey Kasem – Norville "Shaggy" Rogers
 Frank Welker – Fred Jones
 Heather North – Daphne Blake
 Nicole Jaffe – Velma Dinkley

Special guest stars 
 Don Adams – Himself (In "The Exterminator")
 John Astin – Gomez Addams (In "Wednesday Is Missing")
 Joe Besser – Babu (In "Mystery in Persia")
 Daws Butler – Larry and Curly Joe (In "Ghastly Ghost Town" and "The Ghost of the Red Baron")
 Ted Cassidy – Lurch (In "Wednesday Is Missing")
 Sonny & Cher – Themselves (In "The Secret of Shark Island")
 Tim Conway – Himself (In "The Spirit Spooked Sports Show")
 Jackie Coogan – Uncle Fester (In "Wednesday Is Missing")
 Phyllis Diller – Herself (In "A Good Medium Is Rare")
 Sandy Duncan – Herself (In "Sandy Duncan's Jekyll and Hyde")
 Dick Van Dyke – Himself (In "The Haunted Carnival")
 Cass Elliot – Herself (In "The Haunted Candy Factory")
 Jodie Foster – Pugsley Addams (In "Wednesday Is Missing")
 Larry Harmon – Stan Laurel (In "The Ghost of Bigfoot")
 Pat Harrington – Moe (In "Ghastly Ghost Town" and "The Ghost of the Red Baron")
 Cindy Henderson – Wednesday Addams (In "Wednesday Is Missing")
 Casey Kasem – Robin (In "The Dynamic Scooby-Doo Affair" and "The Caped Crusader Caper")
 Don Knotts – Himself (In "Guess Who's Knott Coming to Dinner?" and "The Spooky Fog of Juneberry")
 Carolyn Jones – Morticia Addams (In "Wednesday Is Missing")
 Davy Jones – Himself (In "The Haunted Horseman of Hagglethorn Hall")
 Jim MacGeorge as Oliver Hardy (In "The Ghost of Bigfoot")
 Jerry Reed – Himself (In "The Phantom of the Country Music Hall")
 Olan Soule – Batman (In "The Dynamic Scooby-Doo Affair" and "The Caped Crusader Caper")
 Janet Waldo – Grandmama Addams (In "Wednesday Is Missing")
 Jonathan Winters – Himself and Maude Frickert (In "The Frickert Fracas")

Home media

U.S. sets 
Upon attempting to release a complete DVD set of the 24-episode series in 2005, Warner Home Video was unable to negotiate agreements with several of the episodes' guest stars to have those episodes included. As a result, the DVD was released under the title The Best of the New Scooby-Doo Movies, and featured only 15 episodes culled from both seasons. The opening titles on this release were edited to remove the images of the Addams Family, Batman and Robin, the Harlem Globetrotters, the Three Stooges, and Laurel and Hardy.

On April 4, 2019, Warner Bros. announced plans to release eight more episodes, both as part of a package with the 15 previously released episodes and as a standalone release. This release was planned for the 50th anniversary of Scooby-Doo. No explanation for the previous appearances' rights issues was provided.

The only episode that has not been released or announced for release on DVD is "Wednesday Is Missing", which features the Addams Family.

Season set

Volume sets

Other releases

The two episodes featuring Batman and Robin and two of the three episodes featuring the Harlem Globetrotters were also included in two separate releases: Scooby-Doo Meets Batman and Scooby-Doo Meets the Harlem Globetrotters.

The Addams Family episode "Wednesday is Missing" was released to VHS in Australia under the title "Scooby-Doo Meets the Addams Family" and was also released in the U.K. on VHS, along with the Three Stooges episode "Ghastly Ghost Town" under the title "Scooby-Doo Meets the Three Stooges". "The Secret of Shark Island" (featuring Sonny and Cher) episode was released in the U.S. and the U.K. on VHS on a video called Hanna-Barbera Presents: The Best of Scooby-Doo.

U.K. releases

See also 
 The ABC Saturday Superstar Movie – another Saturday morning "movie" series on ABC
 Scooby-Doo and Guess Who? – another Scooby-Doo series with a similar premise

References

External links 

 Cartoon Network: Dept. of Cartoons: The New Scooby-Doo Movies – cached copy from Internet Archives
 

1970s American animated television series
1972 American television series debuts
1973 American television series endings
1970s American mystery television series
American children's animated adventure television series
American children's animated comedy television series
American children's animated fantasy television series
American children's animated horror television series
American children's animated mystery television series
English-language television shows
Scooby-Doo television series
American animated television spin-offs
Crossover animated television series
CBS original programming
Crossover fiction
Television series by Hanna-Barbera
Television series by Warner Bros. Television Studios
Television series created by Joe Ruby
Television series created by Ken Spears